Anne Heather Firth (1 August 191816 January 1961) was a British film actress. She appeared in several leading roles in films of the 1940s. She also worked on the West End stage, appearing in the 1937 play Bonnet Over the Windmill by Dodie Smith.

Selected filmography
 Suspected Person (1942)
 The Goose Steps Out (1942)
 The First of the Few (1942)
 Bell-Bottom George (1944)
 Demobbed (1946)
 Scott of the Antarctic (1948)
 Vengeance Is Mine (1949)

References

Bibliography
 Chapman, James. Past and Present: National Identity and the British Historical Film. I.B.Tauris, 2005.

External links

1918 births
1967 deaths
British film actresses
People from Westcliff-on-Sea